The Women's downhill competition of the Innsbruck 1964 Olympics was held at Axamer Lizum on Thursday, 6 February.

The defending world champion was Christl Haas of Austria; she won the event and led a sweep of the medals for the home country, as Edith Zimmermann took the silver. Traudl Hecher also won the bronze medal in the 1960 downhill at age 16: her daughter Elisabeth Görgl won the same medal in the same event in 2010.

Results
Thursday, 6 February 1964

References 

Women's downhill
Oly
Alp